Ivel Ultra was an Apple II compatible computer designed by Branimir Makanec and developed by Ivasim Electronika in the 1980s. There are two models of the computer; the first model is brown, and the second model is white.

The Ivel Ultra is an 8-bit Croatian personal computer manufactured in 1984. It was designed by Branimir Makanec and is compatible with the Apple II. It was equipped with one or two 5.25" floppy disk drives. The BASIC language it was equipped with is compatible with Apple I. The operating system called IDOS is also compatible with Apple DOS 3.3.

The Ivel Ultra could be equipped with a second Zilog Z80 processor in order to offer compatibility with the CP / M operating system.

It was produced in different versions: The first model (1984—1986) has a brown case, the following model (1987—1990) has a white case.

Specifications 

 CPU: MOS Technology 6502 at 1 MHz
 ROM: 12 KB (BASIC language interpreter and machine language monitor)
 RAM: 64 KB
 Graphic mode: 280 x 192 pixels, 6 colors
 Text mode: 40 x 24
 Operating system: IDOS, compatible with Apple DOS 3.3, CP / M (with second Z80 CPU)

External links 
Ivel Ultra, on old-computers.com

References

Personal computers